The Cool Kids is an American television sitcom created by Charlie Day and Paul Fruchbom for Fox. The series follows three male residents of a retirement community who are forced to adapt to the arrival of a new, rebellious female occupant and it stars David Alan Grier, Martin Mull, Leslie Jordan, and Vicki Lawrence. On October 19, 2018, it was announced that Fox had ordered an additional nine episodes of the series, bringing the first season total up to twenty-two episodes. On May 10, 2019, The Cool Kids was canceled by Fox after one season.

The Cool Kids is a joint production by 3 Arts Entertainment, FX Productions, and 20th Century Fox Television.

Premise
The Cool Kids follows three male senior citizen friends at Shady Meadows Retirement Community who "are the top dogs until they're blown out of the water by the newest member of the community, a female rebel who's ready to challenge their place – it's high school with 70 somethings."

Cast and characters

Main
 David Alan Grier as Hank Henderson, the leader of the group at Shady Meadows Retirement Community.
 Martin Mull as Charlie
 Leslie Jordan as Sidney "Sid" Delacroix
 Vicki Lawrence as Margaret Flynn

Recurring
 Jamie Farr as Dudley, a resident at Shady Meadows Retirement Community whom the gang finds annoying.
 Artemis Pebdani as Allison, the head of Shady Meadows Retirement Community.
 Lesley Ann Warren as Kathleen, Charlie's girlfriend.
 Jere Burns as John, Sid's ex-boyfriend.
 Rod McCary as Gorgeous George, a resident at Shady Meadows Retirement Community and an antagonist of the group.
 Punam Patel as Punam, an employee of the Shady Meadows Retirement Community.

Guest

 Charlie Day as Chet ("Pilot"), the Shady Meadows Retirement Community handyman.
 Megan Ferguson as Jennifer ("Margaret Turns 65")
 Ravi Patel as Doctor Chad ("Sid Comes Out"), a doctor at the Shady Meadows Retirement Community.
 Max Gail as Robert ("Sid Comes Out"), one of Margaret's love interests.
 Travis Schuldt as Walt Delacroix ("Sid Comes Out"), Sid's son.
 Charles Shaughnessy as Murray ("Thanksgiving at Murray's")
 Julia Duffy as Francine ("Thanksgiving at Murray's")
 Clyde Kusatsu as Norman ("Thanksgiving at Murray's")
 Tammy Townsend as Felicia ("Hank the Cradle Robber"), a younger woman who Hank briefly dates.
 Ed Begley Jr. as Karl ("Margaret Dates the Zodiac Killer"), a creepy man at the Shady Meadows Retirement Community who Margaret dates and suspects to be the Zodiac Killer.
 Jackée Harry as Lorraine ("Funeral Crashers" and "Vegas Baby!"), Hank's ex-wife.
 Rick Fox as Reggie ("Funeral Crashers" and "Vegas Baby!"), Lorraine's boyfriend.
 Bob Gunton as Colonel Christianson ("Funeral Crashers")
 Erik Kilpatrick as Albert ("Charlie's Angel")
 Mary Elizabeth Ellis as Margaret "MJ" Flynn Jr. ("Margaret Jr."), Margaret's daughter.
 Joanna Cassidy as Joanie ("The Cool Kids Plus One"), Margaret's best friend.
 Stephen Tobolowsky as Leonard ("Margaret Ups Her Game")
 Patrick Duffy as Gene ("Margaret Ups Her Game")
 Jennifer Coolidge as Bonnie Delacroix ("Sid's Ex-Wife"), Sid's ex-wife, with whom he maintains a great relationship after their separation.
 Jon Lovitz as Kip Samgood ("Kip Samgood's Biggest Fan"), Sid's teen idol who performed a song Margaret originally wrote.
 Robert Pine as Richard McCormick ("Indecent Proposal")
 Carolyn Hennesy as Annie McCormick ("Indecent Proposal")
 Tony Rock as Tony ("Vegas Baby!"), Hank and Lorraine's son.
 Lynne Marie Stewart as Judy ("The Friend-aversary")

Episodes

Production

Development
On September 5, 2017, it was announced that Fox had given the production a pilot order. The pilot was written by Charlie Day and Paul Fruchbom with Kevin Abbott set to serve as showrunner if the pilot was ordered to series. Executive producers are set to include Day, Abbott, Rob McElhenney, Glenn Howerton, and Nick Frenkel with Fruchbom co-executive producing. Production companies involved with the pilot include 20th Century Fox Television and FX Productions. On November 16, 2017, it was announced that Don Scardino would direct the pilot.

On May 9, 2018, it was announced that Fox had given the production a series order. A few days later, it was announced that the series would premiere in the fall of 2018 and air on Fridays at 8:30 P.M. On June 12, 2018, it was reported that Patrick Walsh was replacing Abbott in the role of showrunner and was also joining the series as an executive producer. On June 28, 2018, it was announced that the series would premiere on September 28, 2018.  On October 19, 2018, it was announced that Fox had ordered an additional nine episodes of the series, bringing the first season total up to twenty-two episodes. The series finale aired on May 10, 2019.

Casting
Alongside the announcement of the pilot's director, it was confirmed that Vicki Lawrence, David Alan Grier, Leslie Jordan, and Martin Mull had been cast in the pilot's lead roles. On November 9, 2018, it was announced that Lesley Ann Warren would make a guest appearance in an episode entitled "Charlie's Angel". The episode was notably set to serve as a reunion for Mull and Warren who had previously starred together in the 1985 film Clue.

Opening
For the opening of the show, a video of Michael and Carol Garland of Bedford, Texas is used.

Release

Marketing
On May 14, 2018, Fox released the first trailer for the series.

Premiere
On September 13, 2018, the series took part in the 12th Annual PaleyFest Fall Television Previews which featured a preview screening of the series and a conversation with cast members including David Alan Grier, Martin Mull, Vicki Lawrence, and Leslie Jordan.

Reception

Critical response
The series has been met with a mixed to positive response from critics upon its premiere. On the review aggregation website Rotten Tomatoes, the series holds an approval rating of 65% with an average rating of 6.1 out of 10, based on 17 reviews. The website's critical consensus reads, "Though the cheesy jokes and cliches are old hat, an all-too-uncommon focus on older characters makes it easier to forgive The Cool Kids' lack of fresh wrinkles." Metacritic, which uses a weighted average, assigned the series a score of 42 out of 100 based on 9 critics, indicating "mixed or average reviews".

Ratings

References

External links
 
 

2010s American LGBT-related comedy television series
2010s American sitcoms
2018 American television series debuts
2019 American television series endings
American LGBT-related sitcoms
English-language television shows
Fox Broadcasting Company original programming
Television series by 20th Century Fox Television
Television series by 3 Arts Entertainment